Bass Highway can refer to:

Bass Highway (Victoria)
Bass Highway (Tasmania)